Sleeping Acres is a 1921 American film starring Australian actor Snowy Baker. It was Baker's first American movie and was made for producer Willian N. Selig who specialised in adventure tales. A contemporary fan magazine said that " The Australian possesses a magnetic screen personality. His novel stunts, thrilling athletic feats, and superb horsemanship feature his American debut." The picture also features Wallace Beery.

References

External links

Sleeping Acres at TCMDB

1921 films
American black-and-white films
American silent short films
Films directed by Bertram Bracken
1920s American films